The general speed limit for cars in Iceland is  in urban areas,  on rural gravel roads and  on paved rural roads. It is allowed to set higher speed limits up to  if deemed safe and necessary for traffic flow but no road actually has higher than the  limit.

Iceland also has lower advisory speed limits, which are indicated by rectangular blue signs with white letters. They are mainly used in trouble spots on rural highways such as when approaching a sharp corner or a single-lane bridge.

References

Iceland
Transport in Iceland